The Journal of International Law of Peace and Armed Conflict (German:  Humanitäres Völkerrecht - Informationsschriften) is an academic journal of international law published quarterly by the Secretary General of the German Red Cross and the Institute for International Law of Peace and Armed Conflict. It was established in 1988 and the editor-in-chief is Hans-Joachim Heintze.

Scope 
The journal publishes articles both in German and in English. The content of the journal mainly consists of articles on the implementation of international humanitarian law, human rights, and peacekeeping law.

External links 
 

Publications established in 1988
International law journals
Multilingual journals
Quarterly journals